The 1970 Rothmans 250 Production Classic was an endurance motor race for Series Production Touring Cars staged at the Surfers Paradise International Raceway in Queensland, Australia on 1 November 1970.
Race distance was 125 laps of the 2 mile circuit, a total of 250 miles.
Cars competed in four classes based on purchase price.

Results

Note: The above results table shows only the top ten outright finishers plus the top three placegetters in each class.

References

Australian Competition Yearbook, 1971
The Courier Mail, Thursday, 22 October 1970
The Courier Mail, Monday, 2 November 1971

Motorsport at Surfers Paradise International Raceway
Rothmans 250 Production Classic
November 1970 sports events in Australia